Geetha Arts is an Indian film production and distribution company known for its works in Telugu cinema. It is established in 1972 by Allu Aravind. The company is based out of Hyderabad. It has produced around 60 films majority of them in Telugu in addition to a few films in Hindi, Malayalam, Tamil, and Kannada languages.

Geetha Arts marked its beginning through the 1974 Teugu film Bantrothu Bharya. The company has made movies featuring actors such as Chiranjeevi, Rajinikanth, Aamir Khan, Ravichandran, Pawan Kalyan, Allu Arjun, Ganesh, Nani, Ram Charan, Nikhil Siddharth and Vijay Deverakonda. It has also expanded its presence into film distribution, exhibition and digital content.

History 
Geetha Arts is an Indian film production and distribution company established in 1972 by Allu Aravind, the son of veteran Telugu comedian Allu Ramalingaiah. The company was named after the Hindu philosophical text Bhagavad Geeta which inspired Allu Aravind. It is formerly known as Geetha Art Productions, Geetha Cine Enterprises, Geetha Creative Arts.

Online streaming service 
 
Allu Aravind in association with MyHome Group owner Rameswar Rao Jupally started OTT named "Aha" which went live on February 8, 2020.

Film production

Geetha Arts

Prashanthi Creations (Sastry, Aravind)

Sri Sai Ram Arts (Venkateswara Rao, Aravind)

Sri Raghavendra Movie Corporation, Siri Media Arts and United Producers (Dutt, Aravind)

Kshitij Production Combines (Mukesh, Aravind)

Siri Venkateswara Productions (Satya Narayana, Aravind)

GA2 Pictures (Vasu and Aravind) 
GA2 Pictures is indie production arm of Geetha Arts on which they produce small and medium budgeted movies and managed by Bunny Vas.

V4 Movies (GA2 and Studio Green)

Allu Bobby Company (Bobby and Aravind)

Allu Entertainment

Film distribution

Geetha Film Distributors 
Geetha Film Distributors (GFD), a subsidiary of Geetha Arts has released over 300 Telugu, Hindi and English films in Andhra Pradesh.
Vinaro Bhagyamu Vishnu Katha (2023)
Malikappuram (2023, dubbed version)
Kantara (2022, dubbed version)
Naane Varuvean (2022, dubbed version)
Zombie Reddy (2021)
Mamangam (2019, dubbed version))
Nuvvu Thopu Raa (2019)
Kurukshetram (2019, dubbed version)
Paper Boy (2018)
Bhadram Be Careful Brotheru (2016)
Yevadu (2014)
Cameraman Gangatho Rambabu (2012)
Khaleja (2010)
Komaram Puli (2010)
Leader (2010)
Magadheera (2009)
Ghajini (2008)
Parugu (2008)
Jalsa (2008)
Desamuduru (2006)
Stalin (2006)
Happy (2006)
Andarivaadu (2005)
Johnny (2003)
Annayya (2000)
Iddaru Mitrulu (1999)
Tholi Prema (1998)
Bavagaru Bagunnara? (1998)
Paradesi (1998)
Pelli Sandadi (1996)
Big Boss (1995)
Mechanic Alludu (1993)
Rowdy Alludu (1991)
Gang Leader (1991)
Stuartpuram Police Station (1991)
Raja Vikramarka (1990)
Kodama Simham (1990)
Attaku Yamudu Ammayiki Mogudu (1989)
Trinetrudu (1988)
Khaidi No. 786 (1988)
Yamudiki Mogudu (1988)
Rudraveena (1988)
Jebu Donga (1987)
Pasivadi Pranam (1987)

References

External links

 

Film production companies based in Hyderabad, India
Film production companies of India
Indian film studios
1972 establishments in Andhra Pradesh
Indian companies established in 1972